Thanga Magan, literally translated from Tamil as "Golden Son", may refer to:

Thanga Magan (1983 film), directed by A. Jagannathan, starring Rajinikanth and Poornima in the lead roles
Thanga Magan (2015 film), directed by Velraj, starring Dhanush, Samantha and Amy Jackson in the lead roles